Hornby Railways is a British model railways manufacturing company. Its roots date back to 1901 in Liverpool, when founder Frank Hornby received a patent for his Meccano construction toy. The first clockwork train was produced in 1920.  In 1938, Hornby launched its first 00 gauge train. In 1964, Hornby and Meccano were bought by their competitor, Tri-ang, and sold when Tri-ang went into receivership. Hornby Railways became independent again in the 1980s, and became listed on the London Stock Exchange, but due to financial troubles reported in June 2017, became majority owned by British turnaround specialist Phoenix Asset Management.

Apart from trains, Hornby also commercialises model cars and other vehicles through its brands Bassett-Lowke, Corgi, Jouef, Lima, Pocher, and Scalextric.

History

Early history: 1920–1938 

Hornby was at first a tradename for the railway productions of Meccano Ltd and based around Liverpool. Until 1907 the company produced under the name of Mechanics made easy. Hornby released its first train, a clockwork 0 gauge (1:48) model, in 1920. An electric train soon followed but was under-designed and the few that were made were sold in France. In 1925, a much more successful electric model was introduced, operating on the high voltage of 110 volts AC power.

Safety concerns saw low voltage 4V and then 6V motors introduced, followed by a reliable 20V AC system, which was developed in the early 1930s. However, clockwork remained the mainstay of the Hornby 0 gauge trains until 1937 and became the only power available in Liverpool-made 0 gauge trains from 1949. Competitors in the UK were Leeds Model Company and Bassett-Lowke.

A factory was established in France, which developed its own range of French outline trains, but Liverpool dominated export activity elsewhere, with large numbers of Hornby trains exported to Australia, New Zealand, Argentina and Scandinavia. Even though the export models were often painted in 'foreign' liveries, Hornby trains looked very British. Hornby attempted to break into the American market by setting up a factory in 1927 in Elizabeth, New Jersey, to make American-style trains.

These were colourful and attractive, but low-market and only clockwork. They probably would have failed in the marketplace because several established U.S. firms could undercut them and Hornby offered no better-class goods or electric models, but the Wall Street Crash precipitated matters. In late 1929, Meccano Ltd. sold its New Jersey factory to the A. C. Gilbert Company and Hornby trains had vanished from the U.S. market by 1930. The leftover inventory was sold in Canada and in the UK and some of the tooling was reused for products in other markets.

Hornby Dublo era: 1938–1963

Meccano introduced its OO scale trains in 1938 under the name 'Hornby Dublo'. The locomotives were diecast metal, and the carriages and wagons were generally made of tinplate. This was a very well planned range of electric and clockwork models, successfully consolidating 12 V DC as the standard for OO scale. This led to the adoption of OO as a broadly accepted modelling standard in the UK, whereas much of the rest of the world adopted HO scale. As for their O gauge locomotives, electric Hornby Dublo locomotives ran on a third rail electric system with the track built on a pressed tinplate base.

Both OO and HO use the same track gauge, but their scales are different. Beginning as literally "half O gauge", the HO models of continental prototypes at 3.5 mm/foot (1:87) scale were workable but Hornby chose to slightly increase the scale to 4 mm/foot for the smaller British prototypes, to provide more internal space for a motor. This has had the effect, remaining to this day, of making their gauge an apparent  rather than the true .

The range expanded quickly, but was curtailed from 1940 due to World War II, production being completely suspended in 1942. Production resumed after the war but did not reach full capacity until 1948. Clockwork models were not produced in 00 scale after the war.

In 2008, a special commemorative model of LNER Class A4 4498 Sir Nigel Gresley was produced, in period packaging, to celebrate the 70th anniversary of this introduction.

Like its counterparts Bassett-Lowke and Exley in the UK and Lionel and American Flyer in the US, Hornby thrived in the first half of the 1950s but struggled in the second half of the decade. The company was slow to recognise the threat posed by rival manufacturers (particularly Triang-Rovex) and to realise the potential of plastic. In 1959, far too late, Hornby introduced two-rail track and moulded plastic rolling stock (the Super Detail series), but even then the system was complicated and difficult to use in comparison to its rivals. With the benefit of hindsight, the policy of keeping the faith with its existing three-rail users whilst bringing the two-rail system to the market was a mistake that cost the company dearly. Whilst all the newer plastic-wheeled rolling stock was compatible with either system, the locomotives (and track) most definitely were not, requiring the two parallel productions of practically every locomotive* in the range to be offered in both formats.  Meanwhile, the company persisted in producing a range of very old-fashioned 0 gauge models, in 1957 completely retooling much of the range instead of taking the opportunity to discontinue it, indicative of major failings at management level.

(* With the exception of the very first two-rail locomotive, a Southern Region R1 0-6-0 tank engine)

Tri-ang Hornby: 1964–1972

In 1964, Lines Bros Ltd., the parent company of rival Tri-ang Railways, purchased Meccano Ltd., and merged Hornby and Tri-ang into Tri-ang Hornby. The former Hornby line was discontinued in favour of Tri-ang's less costly plastic designs. The Hornby Dublo tooling was sold to G & R Wrenn, which continued to make most of the loco range and 'superdetail' rolling stock. Remaining stocks of 0 gauge were either scrapped or sold to the local retailer Hattons Model Railways.

Hornby Railways: 1972–1980

The Tri-ang group was disbanded in 1971 when Meccano Ltd's owner Lines Bros. filed for bankruptcy. The former Tri-ang Hornby was sold to Dunbee-Combex-Marx, becoming Hornby Railways in 1972. By 1976 Hornby was facing challenges from Palitoy and Airfix, both of which were producing high quality detailed models. Detail on the models was upgraded to make the product line more attractive to adult hobbyists.

Zero 1 
A 16 channel command control system named Zero 1 was introduced in late 1979. Zero 1 was based on digital, not analogue, technology and as such was a forerunner to the NMRA Digital Command Control (DCC) system, which appeared in the 1990s. Advertisements claimed that 16 locomotives could be operated independently at the same time. Though an important milestone, Zero 1 was not widely successful; the controller units and decoder modules required for the locomotives were expensive, but with clean track and well serviced locos the system worked well. Control of points and other accessories was available in a very simple manner. Locomotives equipped with a Zero 1 decoder could not be used on conventional direct current systems, making it difficult to run one's locomotives on friends' layouts or club layouts. This was a common issue with command control systems in that time period. Locomotives with no decoder could not be used on a Zero 1 layout either.

The Master Control unit was discontinued in 1985, the Slave controller, Loco Modules, and accessory modules were still available until the late 1980s. The system is still used today by many modellers, highlighted by the demand on such sites like eBay for the items in the secondhand market. Despite being on the market for a short time, Zero 1 had the largest installed base among command control systems in the early 1980s in North America, according to a reader survey done by Model Railroader magazine.

Zero 1 had 3 'phased' introductions.
Phase 1 = Master controller and basic system (Master controller, Slave, hand held slave unit and Loco modules)
Phase 2 = Accessory control (Points, Signals etc.)
Phase 3 = Micro Mimic display (Allowed for LED'S to represent status of points and signals on a mimic display panel)

The system was mains frequency dependent, so 50 and 60 Hz versions were available (60 Hz Canada/US only).
The Main Master unit was discontinued in 1986, and finally the last time Loco Modules were listed was in the 1991 catalogue 'Limited supplies of R955 Loco module are available'. Repairs to Zero 1 units were no longer undertaken by Hornby apparently due to 'Lack of available parts required'.

Rocket 
As part of the 1980 Rocket 150 celebrations, Hornby released a live steam-powered  gauge locomotive, a model of Stephenson's Rocket A major goal was to make real live steam accessible to an indoor domestic environment. The boiler was considerably smaller than the external diameter, surrounded by a thick insulating jacket to prevent burns. It was fuelled by butane gas, from cigarette lighter refills. To provide more torque from the small cylinders, gearing was adeptly hidden between the cranks and the wheels. The track was of asymmetric moulded plastic units, representing the fishbelly rails of the period. These could be assembled either way round, to give either curved or straight track.

By 1980, the market was extremely tough and Dunbee-Combex-Marx was liquidated, placing Hornby in receivership.

Hornby Hobbies Limited: 1980–2015

In 1980, Hornby became Hornby Hobbies and in 1981 a management buyout saw the company back on a sound footing. It went public in 1986.

By the early 1990s Hornby again faced competition from newcomers such as Dapol and established foreign manufacturers, including Lima and Bachmann Industries. Manufacturing was moved to Guangdong province in China in 1995, completed by 1999, in a cost-cutting exercise. As part of the process Hornby also bought in some of Dapol's products and also some of the old Airfix moulds (by then owned by Dapol). Train sets based on Thomas the Tank Engine and Friends and Harry Potter (the "Hogwarts Express") have been particularly profitable ventures. In September 2003 Hornby released its first steam-powered 00 gauge locomotive, a model of the record-breaking Mallard. Several other "Live Steam" locomotives have now been produced.

Since then Hornby has bought Lima, an Italian model railway equipment manufacturer that had previously acquired Jouef, a French manufacturer. Some of the ex-Lima models appear in the main Hornby products list. This range is known as Hornby International. This acquisition also included the Rivarossi line of HO-scale products, also originally from Italy, and the Arnold brand of N-scale products. They also took over the Spanish model railway company Electrotren. Electrotren had been the Spanish importer for Scalextric, sold in Spain as Superslot. The takeover was at the request of the Spanish company and was not due to obvious financial problems. They have remained independent outside of the Hornby International umbrella.

With competition mainly from Bachmann Industries, and to a much lesser extent from minor and generally niche players such as the Danish model railway company Heljan, Dapol, Vi Trains and Peco,  Hornby Railways produced a large range of highly detailed British steam and diesel locomotives, such as the BR 9F, LNER Class A4, SR Merchant Navy, Class 60, Class 50, Class 31 and Class 08.

In November 2006, Hornby Hobbies acquired Airfix and Humbrol paints for the sum of £2.6 million.
The parent company, Humbrol, had gone into administration earlier that year after cashflow problems. Airfix fans had been concerned that it could be the end of the brand, but just as the name Hornby was once a tradename of Meccano, Airfix is now a successful tradename of Hornby.

In May 2008, Hornby announced the acquisition of Corgi Classics Limited, one of the world's oldest makers of collectable die-cast models of trucks, buses, cars and aeroplanes, from Corgi International Limited for £7.5million.

In 2009, the Hornby Shop and Visitor Centre was in development. Christmas 2009 saw the launch of the new Hornby Shop at Margate in Kent, with the visitor centre still under construction. July 2010 saw the opening of the Hornby Shop And Visitor Centre.

Financial troubles, PAM takeover
From 2015, Hornby plc began to announce a series of declining financial results. The major reason behind the decline Hornby declared was twofold, with the decline in the number of collecting customers, (older customers dying and not being replaced by younger ones), and a general lack of interest in modelling as a hobby in light of the digitization and advancement of the internet games industry. After the PLC shares dropped by more than 50% in a year, at the 2016 results, Hornby declared that it planned to cut more than half of the toys it made, after discovering that it generated 90% of its profits from only 50% of its range. In the year to 31 March 2017, revenues fell further to £47.4m from £55.8m, while underlying losses widened to £6.3m from a £5.7m deficit in 2016. The financial declines culminated in July 2017, when the largest shareholder Phoenix Asset Management (PAM) agreed to buy 17.6 million Hornby shares for 32.375p from the second largest - and activist/protagonist shareholder - New Pistoia Income (NPI), which gave PAM a 55.2% holding in the company. Under stock exchange rules, this triggered a mandatory takeover offer of Hornby by PAM, at the NPI strike price of 32.375p, valuing Hornby at £27.4million. As a result of the takeover, the chairman of Hornby resigned from the company in August 2017, followed by the Chief Executive in September 2017.

In October 2017, PAM announced their new management team who would join the company and steer through the turnaround.  They were Lyndon Davies, former Mettoy employee and owner of Oxford Diecast.  Simon Kohler, ex Hornby marketing manager  and Tim Mulhall, also from Oxford Diecast and credited with knowledge of the International market, having been the former importer for Hornby International brands in the UK.

The trio proposed a turnaround plan to reengage with the market, make products which were more appealing to customers, clamp down on rising overheads and recover first sales and then move the company back into profitability. The outcomes were not expected to bear fruit for 3–5 years.

The end of year Annual Report for March 2018 revealed how serious the position was for the company, showing further slumps in revenue (down to £35.7m) and a widening pre-tax loss (up to £7.6m).

The March 2019 end of year report showed progress, having stabilised the business, closed unnecessary offices and returned to their historic home in Margate. Sales grew to £37.8m, losses narrowed to £2.8m 

The COVID-19 pandemic in 2020 was one element credited in a sales growth of 30%, which was announced in the 2019/20 half year results which covered a period to March 2020. Half year sales of £21m (up from £15.9m) and the first profit in 8 years.

In August 2021, it was announced that Hornby had acquired the remaining 51% of LCD Enterprises (who owned Oxford Diecast) for £1.3 million. This followed Hornby's 49% stake in the company, for which they had acquired in 2017.

In October 2022 Hornby released a range of TT:120 items. Two train sets are being offered, with four series of locomotives and rolling stock available.

Collector and enthusiasts' groups
Pre-1964 Hornby trains have enjoyed a level of adult collector interest since the 1940s. In 1969 the Hornby Railway Collector's Association was founded to cater for this and currently enjoys a membership approaching 3000, producing 10 journals a year, as well as other literature. Publications on older Hornby and Meccano products are dominated by those published by New Cavendish Books as "The Hornby Companion Series", in particular Chris & Julie Graebe's "The Hornby Gauge 0 System" and Michael Foster's sister volume on Hornby Dublo. Triang-Hornby and later Hornby products are catered for by the Train Collectors' Society.

Brands
Hornby owns Humbrol and, through that acquisition, Airfix, and Corgi Toys. It also owns a number of established brands in the model railway market.

Lima

Lima was an Italian company that was a popular, affordable supplier of model railway material but market pressures in the mid-1990s led to Lima merging with Rivarossi, Arnold, and Jouef. When these consolidations failed and operations ceased in 2004, Hornby Railways acquired Lima's assets. As of mid 2006, a range of these products has been made available under the Hornby International brand, refitted with NEM couplings and sprung buffers and sockets for DCC decoders. Lima also had a popular OO gauge range much like Hornby, which strengthened the case for acquisition.

Jouef

Arnold

Rivarossi

Skaledale
‘Skaledale’ is a range of resin buildings and track accessories produced for 00 gauge railways by Hornby Hobbies Ltd. Production began in 2003 when an initial range of only 6 items were distributed into the market place. The interest and demand proved so positive that the range increased the following year to include new domestic style buildings plus the introduction of station and trackside buildings.

Many of the models are similar to those of 'Lyddle End' (a range which followed 'Skaledale'), but these “N” Gauge buildings are produced to a smaller scale of 1:148.

The Skaledale range comprises station buildings, platforms, trackside accessories, shops, houses, churches, monuments and street furniture.

Forbes Outfitters and St. Andrews Church for example, provided the inspiration for their scaled down models, although others are adapted to suit a particular price point or subject.  The station and trackside buildings are inspired by actual structures but again in some cases adapted to suit manufacturing constraints. Some of the station pieces were inspired by Goathland railway station.

Lyddle End
Lyddle End is the range of N scale model railway buildings for Hornby Railways. The buildings are created from high quality die cast resin and are made to represent the fictional village of Lyddle End, somewhere in England. Most of the buildings are models of GWR style buildings made out of red sandstone.

Hornby created these buildings thanks to the success of their 00 gauge buildings, which they call Skaledale. Many of the buildings are the same as their Skaledale equivalent, except in different scales, to save the cost of designing a new model. They are generally released about 6 months to a year behind their 00 counterparts. When Hornby announced their 2010 range, Lyddle End was not mentioned, presumably ended.

In media
An attempt to build the world's longest model railway formed the final episode of James May's Toy Stories.

Hornby was heavily involved, providing the track and the prototype of their OO gauge British Rail Class 395 Javelin train. Simon Kohler, marketing manager of Hornby model railways, said that the train which travels at just  failed two miles short of Bideford station; but he also told BBC News "Even though the last locomotive gave up the ghost at Instow, we did link the track. In April 2011 on the TV series James May's Toy Stories: Revisited, James tried again, this time against the Germans. All the trains reached their destinations and the British team won.

In 2019 the mini-series James May's Big Trouble in Model Britain was broadcast on BBC Four, which the channel described as, 'A year inside Hornby Hobbies – an iconic British toymaker on the brink of collapse.'

In 2021, a ten episode series was produced by Rare TV for the Yesterday TV channel called Hornby: A Model World, which went behind the scenes at Hornby and also featured models from Airfix, Scalextric and Corgi within various episodes.

One:One Collection

In 2019 the One:One Collection of real historic engines and rolling stock, opened at Hornby's former Margate factory having been purchased by Jeremy Hosking, with some Hosking owned rolling stock placed on display.

See also
 Hornby Virtual Railway
 Hornby Track Master

Notes

References 
 Foster, Michael (1980) Hornby Dublo Trains: 1938–1964: The story of the perfect table railway, Hornby Companion Series, vol. 3, New Cavendish Books, 
 
 
 Hornby PLC (2004) Hornby OO Scale Model Railways: Fiftieth Edition, Product catalogue: R8108, Limited anniversary edition, EAN 501-0-9634810-8-7
 Schneider, Lewis (May 2000) Hornby's made-in-USA trains, Classic Toy Trains, vol. 13, p. 84
 Kohler, Simon (April 2011) - Marketing Manager - Hornby Hobbies Limited

External links 

 

 Online database of Hornby Railways models 1955–2011
 Resource of model railway history and references
 DCC Wiki: More info on Hornby's Zero 1 system
 Hornby Trains

 
Design companies established in 1901
1901 establishments in England
Toy companies established in 1901
British companies established in 1901
1964 mergers and acquisitions
Model railroad manufacturers
Toy train manufacturers
Die-cast toys
Toy companies of the United Kingdom
Manufacturing companies established in 1901
Companies based in Kent
Toy cars and trucks
Slot car manufacturers
British brands
Articles containing video clips